Oberstinzel is a commune in the Moselle department in Grand Est in north-eastern France. The similarly named commune Niederstinzel lies 8 km to the north.

See also
 Communes of the Moselle department

References

External links
 

Communes of Moselle (department)